Clear Lake is a natural body of water impounded by sand dunes along the Oregon Coast of the Pacific Ocean in the United States. Clear Lake is closed to public access to protect the purity of the water.

U.S. Route 101 runs north–south along the west side of the lake. The community of Winchester Bay is north of the lake; Umpqua Lighthouse State Park and the mouth of the Umpqua River are to the northwest, and Oregon Dunes National Recreation Area runs along the coast to the west. The outflow from Clear Lake is south to Edna Lake, Clear Creek, and Eel Lake.

Water from this string of lakes, including Eel Lake and Tenmile Lake, flows generally south into Tenmile Creek in Coos County, which flows west into the Pacific near the community of Lakeside.

See also
 List of lakes in Oregon

References

External links
 Annual Water-Quality Reports for Reedsport

Lakes of Oregon
Lakes of Douglas County, Oregon